Bernard Rose  (1960, London) is an English filmmaker and screenwriter, considered a pioneer of digital filmmaking. He is best known for directing the horror films Paperhouse (1988) and Candyman (1992), the historical romances Immortal Beloved (1994) and Anna Karenina (1997), and the independent drama Ivans xtc (2000), for which he was nominated for the Independent Spirit Award for Best Director and the John Cassavetes Award. He has also been nominated for the Grand Prix des Amériques and the Venice Horizons Prize.

Life and career
Rose was born in London, the son of a father who was born Jewish and a mother who had converted to Judaism. His mother was a granddaughter of the Earl Jellicoe. He began making super 8 films when he was 9. By 1975, he won an amateur film competition hosted by BBC which led to the broadcasting of his works. He worked for Jim Henson on the last season of The Muppet Show and then again on The Dark Crystal in 1981. He attended National Film and Television School and graduated in 1982 with a Master's in Filmmaking. After this, he moved on to directing music videos for MTV, one of which was the uncensored version of Frankie Goes To Hollywood's hit "Relax".

Shortly after his production of music videos, he moved on to direct British TV films such as Prospects and then finally in 1988 directed his first major full-length film, Paperhouse. Rose got his big break internationally with 1992's Candyman, which has since been seen as a cult classic. Subsequently, Rose both wrote and directed Immortal Beloved, about the life and loves of Ludwig van Beethoven, as well as a remake of Leo Tolstoy's Anna Karenina.

In 2012, Rose directed Two Jacks, a drama based on Leo Tolstoy's short story "Two Hussars," starring Sienna Miller and Danny Huston. In 2014, Rose directed the musical drama The Devil's Violinist. This was followed by a contemporary adaptation of Mary Shelley's Frankenstein. He's currently attached to Samurai Marathon, a Japanese-produced historical drama currently in post-production. He is a frequent collaborator of actor and filmmaker Danny Huston. Rose is also a contributor to the webseries Trailers from Hell.

Filmography

References

External links
Bernard Rose on Rottentomatoes

1960 births
Living people
English music video directors
English screenwriters
English male screenwriters
Film directors from London
Horror film directors
Alumni of the National Film and Television School
English Jews